The Battle of Leliefontein (also known as the Battle of Witkloof) was an engagement between British-Canadian and Boer forces during the Second Boer War on 7 November 1900, at the Komati River  south of Belfast at the present day Nooitgedacht Dam. 

During the engagement, the Canadian rearguard successfully repelled Boer assaults against the column, facilitating the successful withdrawal of the British-Canadian force from the area. Three members of the Royal Canadian Dragoons were awarded the Victoria Cross for their actions during the battle.

Background
In November 1900, a British force advanced from Belfast towards the Komati River to push the Boer soldiers out of the area. The British force also included the second Canadian contingent to arrive in South Africa, including members of the Royal Canadian Dragoons, the 2nd Canadian Mounted Rifles and "D" Battery of the Canadian Field Artillery.

Led by Major-General Horace Smith-Dorrien, the force arrived at the river on 6 November and drove the Boers from their positions. However, as resistance was stronger than expected, and because Smith-Dorrien had expected the Boers to be reinforced, he ordered his forces to set up camp at Leliefontein for the night, before beginning a withdrawal back to Belfast the following morning.

The Boers that withdrew from their positions in Komati later reconsolidated with reinforcements, having expected the British force to pursue them. The Boer force included the Ermelo Commando and  Carolina Commando. The Boers originally planned to intercept an advancing British force at a road south of the river. However, after the Boers realized that the British-Canadian force was not pursuing them and was withdrawing from the area, they advanced to attack the rear of the British-Canadian column.

Battle

A force led by Lieutenant-Colonel François-Louis Lessard, which included 90–100 men from the Royal Canadian Dragoons, two 12-pounder field guns from "D" Battery of the Canadian Field Artillery, and a horse-drawn M1895 Colt-Browning machine gun, was tasked with covering the larger force's withdrawal as its rearguard. The dragoons were deployed in a  line behind the withdrawing British column, with the horse-drawn machine gun at its centre.

Throughout the morning, the Canadian rearguard positions were assaulted by Boer forces. At one point during the engagement, 200 mounted Boers charged the Canadian's positions in an attempt to break their line. The mounted charge was eventually repulsed by a handful of Royal Canadian Dragoons, and the left section of D Battery under the command of Lieutenant Edward Whipple Bancroft Morrison. During the mounted charge, a field gun was almost taken, although a hastily organized 12-man ambush led by Lieutenant Richard Ernest William Turner prevented the field gun's capture. Although Morrison was injured, the dragoons were able to repel the charge with assistance from the machine gun on their left flank.

The position where the horse-drawn machine gun carriage was placed was then assaulted and eventually taken by the Boers. However, Sergeant Edward James Gibson Holland carried the machine gun off its carriage to prevent its capture, burning his hand on the gun's barrel in the process. During these mounted charges, two of the local Boer commanders, General Joachim Fourie, and Commandant Henry Prinsloo were killed by machine gun fire. Boer General Johann Grobler was also wounded during the engagement. 

Dragoons under Lieutenant Hampden Zane Churchill Cockburn continued to maintain their positions until the rest of the rearguard withdrew further behind them. However as a result of the action, the dragoons under Holland's command were all captured, killed, or wounded; with Holland also sustaining injuries. Boer assaults on the Canadian positions persisted afterwards, although lacked the organization and momentum from earlier assaults with the loss of their commanders. The two 12-pound field guns were used to fight a rearguard action until the Canadians reached the high ground, after which the Boers halted their attack.

Aftermath

After the battle, Smith-Dorrien wrote a letter to the British Chief of Staff, commending the successful rearguard action by the Royal Canadian Dragoons as well as Lessard's leadership.

In addition to commending Lessard, Smith-Dorrien also recommended to the Chief of Staff awarding the Victoria Cross to four members of the Royal Canadian Dragoons, and another military decoration to Lieutenant Morrison. 

Three members of the Royal Canadian Dragoons, including Sergeant Holland, Lieutenant Turner, and Lieutenant Cockburn were awarded the Victoria Cross for their actions at Leliefontein. The Royal Canadian Dragoons remains the only Canadian unit where three of its members were awarded the Victoria Cross in a single day. Private W. A. Knisley of the Royal Canadian Dragoons was also recommended for a Victoria Cross by Smith-Dorrien, although Knisley was not awarded the decoration. Lieutenant Morrison was awarded the Distinguished Service Order for his actions during the engagement.

The two field guns that were involved in the battle are presently held by the Canadian War Museum.

Notes

References

Further reading
Greenhous, Brerton (1983). Dragoon : the Centennial History of The Royal Canadian Dragoons, 1883–1983. Belleville, Ont. : Guild of The Royal Canadian Dragoons, 1983 

Battles involving Canada
Battles of the Second Boer War
Conflicts in 1900
November 1900 events
1900 in South Africa
Royal Canadian Dragoons